Wallace Crossley (October 4, 1874 – December 13, 1943) was the 29th Lieutenant Governor of Missouri, serving with Governor Frederick D. Gardner, and publisher of The Daily Star-Journal in Warrensburg, Missouri.

Biography 
Crossley was born in Bellair, Missouri in Cooper County, Missouri.

He was raised in Boone County, Missouri and grew up in Mexico, Missouri where he attended high school.  He attended William Jewell College and the University of Missouri.

After college he returned to Mexico to teach English and then taught at Warrensburg Normal School (now University of Central Missouri).

In 1907 he acquired The Daily Star-Journal and continued to own it until his death.

He was a member of the Missouri House of Representatives from 1905 to 1911 and Missouri State Senate from 1913 to 1917 and then lieutenant governor from 1917 to 1921.

References

1874 births
1943 deaths
People from Cooper County, Missouri
William Jewell College alumni
University of Missouri alumni
University of Central Missouri faculty
American newspaper publishers (people)
Lieutenant Governors of Missouri
Members of the Missouri House of Representatives
Missouri state senators
People from Mexico, Missouri